Parliamentary elections were held in Portugal on 13 November 1949. Following the late withdrawal of the Democratic Opposition, only eight opposition candidates ran against the ruling National Union.

Electoral system
The elections were held using 21 multi-member constituencies and one single-member constituency covering the Azores, together electing a total of 120 members, 13 of which were from Portuguese colonies.

Voters could delete names from the lists of candidates, but could not replace them. Suffrage was given to all men aged 21 or over as long as they were literate or paid over 100 escudos in taxation, and to women aged over 21 if they had completed secondary education, or if they were the head of a household and met the same literacy and tax criteria as men.

Campaign
The Democratic Opposition withdrew from the election shortly before election day. This left only eight opposition candidates on two lists; a Regionalist list in Castelo Branco including former Prime Minister Francisco Cunha Leal and an Independent Agrarian list in Portalegre including monarchist Pequito Rebelo.

The communist National Democratic Movement and the Youth Movement for Democratic Union both boycotted the election in protest at a lack of free vote.

Results

References

See also
Politics of Portugal
List of political parties in Portugal
Elections in Portugal

Legislative elections in Portugal
Portugal
Legislative election
Portuguese legislative election